Reginald Taylor may refer to:
 Reginald Taylor (cricketer)
 Sir Reginald Taylor (engineer)
 Reggie Taylor (Reginald Tremain Taylor), baseball outfielder

See also
 Reggie Taylor (Canadian football)
 Reg Taylor, Australian rules footballer